Polevoy is a rural locality (a settlement) in Kabansky District, Republic of Buryatia, Russia. The population was 3 as of 2010.

Geography 
Polevoy is located 48 km southwest of Kabansk (the district's administrative centre) by road. Baykalsky Priboy is the nearest rural locality.

References 

Rural localities in Kabansky District